Ukraina (officially TRC Ukraina) was a national Ukrainian-language TV channel, owned by Media Group Ukraine. It began broadcasting as a regional, Donetsk TV channel on March 13, 1993, with getting a national status in 2004. It ceased broadcasting in July 2022. The channel consisted of TV shows, films and TV series, both domestic and foreign.

History 
Channel Ukraine was established in Donetsk in March 1993 as the state utility company Doka-TV. The operator was in stake under Donetsk City Council. The channel started broadcasting in Donetsk on Channel 7, where, as a result it, shared time with other TV companies – "ASKET 7x7" and Sket. The channel was known for its Ukrainophobic policies and promoting the Russian move of integration and also recognise Dombass policies in Ukrainian until 2009.

By the end of the 1990s, ASKET TV was bought out by tycoon Rinat Akhmetov's structures, and in connection with the re-licensing of channels and frequencies, the new owners of ASKET TV offered TRK Ukraina to unite on mutually beneficial terms in order not to share the channel, and develop it all together. In March 2001, CJSC "TRK Ukraina" was established, which received a license for the sixth meter channel in Donetsk, and later for a number of channels in Donetsk and Luhansk regions. Akhmetov's SCM group, which at the time owned 75% of the channel's shares (later, in 2007, SCM became the owner of 99%, and in 2010 - 100% of the channel's shares).

In 2002-2003, the company continued its active development, receiving more than a hundred television frequencies throughout Ukraine, including 11 TV channels in Kyiv, where the channel began broadcasting in June 2003. In the same year, the channel also started broadcasting via satellite. In April 2003, TRK Ukraina became one of the most accessible packages of the Kyiv cable operator Volia. In 2004 during the Orange Revolution, TRK Ukraina was associated as the media resource of Yanukovych's pro-Russian camp and to be a constant repeater of the ideology of the Party of Regions (and later the Opposition Bloc) and to sponsor Rinat Akhmetov as the president. Moreover, in the same year, the channel received national status.

In 2008, Media Group Ukraine was founded and its launch of sports channel Football TV. In the autumn of 2009, TRK Ukraina moved their broadcasting facilities to Kyiv where currently resides its studios and operations today, however their former studios were converted into Donbass regional counterpart in the meter range in Donetsk Oblast, continuing its own broadcasting on decimeter waves.
At the end of 2008, the TV channel officially redesigned their website ever since it was launched in early 2004.

In 2010, the channel rebranding took in stake when TRK branding was dropped and retained the "Ukraine" branding.

In 2013, the channel officially signed the agreement to broadcast the UEFA Euro 2016 and FIFA World Cup 2018 for the first time to broadcast live.

More recently in 2020, the channel officially broadcast in High Definition.

Rinat Akhmetov, the beneficial owner of Media Group Ukraine, returned the licenses of all media assets of the media group to the state in July 2022, hence, the station stopped broadcasting on 22 July 2022 at 10:00 AM Kyiv Time. The ID of the channel remained until 10:08 AM when the feed turned black. According to an official statement, the group returned the licenses due to a new oligarch law in Ukraine. On 21 July 2022 the National Council of Ukraine for Television and Radio had canceled the licenses of  the eight TV channels of Media Group Ukraine.

But in 18 October 2022, previous team launched new channel My-Ukraina, later in 7 November 2022, launched on digital TV.

Language share 
Moreover, this channel is deemed exclusively to be for a Russian-speaking audience in spite of their own cult for pro-Russian etheric policy. Thus, on 16 September 2003, in the final document of the Accounting Chamber of Ukraine on the results of the analysis of the State of Comprehensive Measures for Comprehensive Development of the Ukrainian Language, Planning and Use of the State Budget of Ukraine for their implementation, prepared by the Department of Social Expenditure and Science, it was stated that the reason for the lack of Ukrainian-language broadcasting of commercial television channels was the lack of control over their compliance with the licensing conditions by the National Council of Ukraine on Television and Radio Broadcasting due to regional stir of eastern demeanor.
In 2014,  after the Euromaidan protest and removed Russian influx of culture and aspects of politics, the channel equally shift the use of the Ukrainian language to promote national identity and corresponded diversity of ethic shares of Ukrainians and Russians ever since the government passed the Law on the Principles of the State language policy.

Programming

News/talk 

 Siohodni (Сьогодні) – main news program
 Siohodni Pidsumky (Сьогодні. Підсумки) – daily talk 
Good Morning Ukraine (Ранок з Україною) – Morning show
 Ukraine Speaks (Говорить Україна) – talk

 Novyny Siohodni

Infotainment 

Star Trek (Зірковий шлях) – business
Golovna Tema (Головна тема) – scope program

Entertainment 

 The Masked Singer Ukraine – detective game show
 Snivayutb Vsi – musical game show
 Agents of Justice (Агенти справедливості) – crime drama
 Real Mysticism (Зірковий шлях) – drama

Audience share

Controversies

Anti-Piracy and false takedown notice incident 
Google has been cooperating with requests to hide pirated material from its search engine results. Unfortunately, some legal firms, abuse this option offered by Google and intentionally report anything they suspect “just in case” it happens to be an infringing material. Recently, Vindex Law firm, a partner of TRK managed to send a takedown request to Google asking them to take down content that is actually stored on their own server.  According to the takedown notice, all reported links “illegally provide external links with which users can access and/or download unauthorized copyrighted contents of Football.” That would then include the file on Vindex’s computer.

Since the takedown request mentioned the address 127.0.0.1 which refers to their own host computer, Google is technically asked to remove a file from its servers that doesn’t exist. Needless to say, Google hasn’t taken any action in response and Vindex has not yet commented on this unprofessional action.

See also
 Television in Ukraine

References

External links
Official website 

 
Mass media in Donetsk
Mass media in Kyiv
SCM Holdings
Television channels and stations established in 1993
Television channels and stations disestablished in 2022
Defunct television stations in Ukraine
Ukrainian brands
2022 disestablishments in Ukraine
1993 establishments in Ukraine